The 2016 Booker Prize for Fiction was awarded at a ceremony on 25 October 2016. The Man Booker dozen of 13 books was announced on 27 July, narrowed down to a shortlist of six titles on 13 September. Paul Beatty was awarded the 2016 Booker Prize for his novel The Sellout, receiving 50,000 pounds ($61,000), and becoming the first American author to be awarded the prize.

Judging panel
Amanda Foreman (chair)
Jon Day
Abdulrazak Gurnah
David Harsent
Olivia Williams

Nominees

Shortlist

Longlist

See also
 List of winners and shortlisted authors of the Booker Prize for Fiction

References

Man Booker
Booker Prizes by year
2016 awards in the United Kingdom